Spanglish is a 2004 American romantic comedy-drama film written and directed by James L. Brooks and starring Adam Sandler, Téa Leoni, Paz Vega, and Cloris Leachman.

The film was released in the United States on December 17, 2004, by Columbia Pictures. It was a box office bomb, grossing $55 million worldwide on an $80 million production budget. The film received mixed reviews from critics, with praise for the performances of Sandler and Vega, but criticism for the plot.

Plot
For Cristina Moreno's Princeton University application essay, she tells the story of a year from her childhood, and how it shaped the person she is today.

In 1992, Flor Moreno, a poor Mexican single mother moved to the U.S. seeking a better life for her and her daughter, Cristina. They settle in a Latino community in Los Angeles, Flor works two jobs to support her and her daughter, while never needing to learn English. Flor soon realizes she needs to spend more time with her daughter, so her cousin helps her get work as a housekeeper for the Claskys: John and Deborah, their children Bernice and Georgie, and Deborah's mother Evelyn Wright.

John is a chef and an easygoing family man. Deborah was a businesswoman who lost her job due to downsizing and is now a stay-at-home mother, and Evelyn is an alcoholic retired singer. Uptight and neurotic, Deborah upsets everyone, psychologically abuses and body-shames Bernice, and bullies John, demanding he always back her up. John is torn between defending his kids' mental well-being, and his domineering wife.

Flor gets on well with the Claskys, despite the language barrier. When Deborah rents a house for the summer, she tells Flor she expects her to live in while they're there, since Flor travels by bus and commuting from Los Angeles to Malibu isn't feasible. Faced with losing her job, Flor agrees to bring Cristina and live with the Claskys for the summer.

Deborah quickly becomes attached to the beautiful and personable Cristina, ignoring Bernice; Flor does not approve of the attention. John unwittingly angers Flor when he offers to pay the children a set amount for each bit of sea glass they find on the beach. Cristina earnestly searches for hours, earning $650 for her efforts. Flor and John argue, with Cristina as interpreter; Flor wants to leave because of the awkward family dynamic. He convinces her to stay, to Cristina's delight, and Flor starts an English course to better communicate with the Claskys.

When John's restaurant receives an amazing review, John begins worrying about the added pressure, while Deborah begins an affair. Deborah also secures Cristina a scholarship to Bernice's private school, upsetting Flor, who wants Cristina to maintain her Mexican roots and working-class values. Since Cristina passionately wants to attend the school, Flor agrees. Flor feels Deborah is overstepping her bounds and voices her concerns to John, who tells her he empathizes as Bernice has no support from her own mother. Flor tries to build Bernice's self-confidence with small acts of kindness, especially when Deborah is harsh.

Deborah allows Cristina to bring her friends from the private school over for a sleepover, telling Flor it is a study session, even though Cristina is expected home for a family event. The now-sober Evelyn, knowing about her daughter's affair, warns Deborah that her marriage is in trouble. She pleads with Deborah to end the affair, telling her she will never get another man as good as John.

Deborah tells John about the affair, begging him to talk it out. However, a dejected John walks out, encountering Flor, who has finally had enough of Deborah and wants to quit and retrieve her daughter. Since Cristina is asleep with her friends, John takes Flor to his restaurant, where he cooks for her and they admit their feelings for each other. They acknowledge that they cannot have a relationship. A desperate Deborah continuously tries to contact John and blames Evelyn's failings as a parent for the way she is. They have a frank conversation during which they admit their faults and become closer.

The next day, Flor comes to take her daughter home and informs her that she quit her job, upsetting Cristina. As they are leaving, John tells Flor he will envy whoever ends up with her. On the way home, Flor further upsets Cristina after telling her she cannot attend the private school anymore. Cristina has a meltdown in the street, accusing Flor of ruining her life. After she asks her mother for "space," Flor loses patience and tells Cristina she needs to answer an important question at such a young age: "Is what you want for yourself to become someone very different than me?" Cristina considers this on their bus ride home, and they make up and embrace. The voiceover from the older Cristina tells the Princeton committee that while she would be thrilled by their acceptance, she would not let it define her, as she is already her mother's daughter.

Cast

 Adam Sandler as John Clasky
 Paz Vega as Flor Moreno
 Téa Leoni as Deborah Clasky
 Cloris Leachman as Evelyn Wright
 Aimee Garcia as the narrator (Adult Cristina Moreno)
 Shelbie Bruce as 12-year-old Cristina
 Victoria Luna as 6-year-old Cristina
 Sarah Steele as Bernice "Bernie" Clasky
 Ian Hyland as George "Georgie" Clasky
 Jake Pennington as Young George
 Cecilia Suárez as Monica
 Thomas Haden Church as Mike the Realtor
 Antonio Muñoz as Mexican at Family Dinner
 Spencer Locke as Sleepover Friend
 Sarah Hyland as Sleepover Friend

Production
Brooks cast Sandler after seeing his more dramatic performance in Punch-Drunk Love.

Vega could not speak English when filming began and a translator was on set during filming so that she could communicate with the director.

Leachman replaced Anne Bancroft, who dropped out of the part after four weeks of shooting because of illness.

Reception

Critical response
On Rotten Tomatoes the film has an approval rating of 54% based on reviews from 168 of critics, with an average rating of 6/10. The critical consensus reads, "Paz Vega shines, and Adam Sandler gives a performance of thoughtfulness and depth, but Spanglish is ultimately undermined by sitcommy plotting and unearned uplift." On Metacritic it has a score of 48% based on reviews from 36 critics, indicating "mixed or average reviews".  Audiences polled by CinemaScore gave the film a grade "B+" on scale of A to F.

Its proponents claim it is a moving portrayal of the difficulty of family problems and self-identity (and perhaps to a lesser extent the difficulties and rewards of cross-cultural communication). Advocates of the film found the intense sexual chemistry between Leoni and Sandler particularly compelling. Some critics described the film as "uneven", "awkward," for example, when "John and Flor attempt to bare their souls to one another... [with] lots of words coming out of their mouths, but there doesn't seem to be a context", and "The supporting performers deserve better, especially ... Cloris Leachman, who's consigned to a demeaning role...[and] the butt of rather mean-spirited jokes."

Accolades

See also
Spanglish

References

External links

 
 
 
 

2004 films
2000s Spanish-language films
2004 romantic comedy-drama films
American romantic comedy-drama films
Films scored by Hans Zimmer
Films about language
Films directed by James L. Brooks
Films produced by James L. Brooks
Films set in Los Angeles
Films shot in Los Angeles
Films set in the 1990s
Films set in 1992
Films set in 1998
Films set in the 2000s
Films set in 2004
Films with screenplays by James L. Brooks
Gracie Films films
Columbia Pictures films
Films about Mexican Americans
2004 comedy films
2004 drama films
2000s English-language films
2000s American films